Khirbat al-Buwayra was a Palestinian Arab  village in the Ramle Subdistrict. It was depopulated during the 1948 Arab-Israeli War on July 15, 1948, under the second phase of Operation Dani. It was located 15 km southeast of Ramla.

History
In the 1931 census  El Buweiyiri had 101 Muslim inhabitants, in a total of 17 houses.

In the 1945 statistics, it had a population of 190 Muslims and 1,150  dunums of land.  Of this, 31  dunums were irrigated or used for orchards, 316 dunums were used for cereals,  while 803 dunams were classified as non-cultivable areas.

The center of the village contained many wells and the village has a khirba with the foundation of a building with cisterns. Today the village area is used as a military training ground by the Israeli Army.

References

Bibliography

External links
Welcome To al-Buwayra, Khirbat
 Khirbat Buwayra, Zochrot
Survey of Western Palestine, Map 17:    IAA, Wikimedia commons 

Arab villages depopulated during the 1948 Arab–Israeli War
District of Ramla